Yevgeny Dmitrievich Polivanov was a Soviet linguist, orientalist and polyglot who wrote major works on the Chinese, Japanese, Uzbek and Dungan languages and on theoretical linguistics and poetics.

Life 
He participated in the development of writing systems for the peoples of the Soviet Union and also designed a cyrillization system for Japanese language, which was officially accepted in the Soviet Union and is still the standard in modern Russia. He also translated the Kyrgyz national Epic of Manas into Russian. Polivanov is credited as the scholar who initiated the comparative study of Japanese pitch accent across dialects.

During the Russian revolution of 1917, Polivanov was active first in the Menshevik Party, then he joined the Bolshevik Party. He worked in the Oriental section of the People's Commissariat for Foreign Affairs in 1917–1918 and in the Comintern in 1921.

In 1928–1929 he expressed disagreement with Nicholas Marr's Japhetic theory, which was promoted by the regime at the time. After this he was blackballed from all scholarly institutions in Moscow and Leningrad and until his arrest "was essentially in exile in Central Asia, where he accomplished fruitful work on the local languages."

During the Great Purge, Polivanov was arrested on 16 August 1937 in Bishkek and was charged with spying for Japan. On 1 October, in the Butyrka prison, he requested in writing that the NKVD halt severe interrogation methods against him, arguing that they made him issue false statements that confused the investigation against him. On 25 January 1938, he was tried in a closed session of the Military Collegium of the Supreme Court of the USSR and pleaded not guilty. He was sentenced to death and executed by NKVD near Moscow. He was rehabilitated in 1963. In late October 2018, a memorial containing his name alongside over 6,000 others was erected at Kommunarka.

See also 
Georgy Danilov

References 

1891 births
1938 deaths
People from Smolensk
Mensheviks
Bolsheviks
Linguists from Russia
Russian orientalists
Russian Japanologists
Linguists of Turkic languages
Linguists from the Soviet Union
20th-century linguists
Soviet rehabilitations
Great Purge victims from Russia